Josef Machan (born 29 October 1957) is a Czech sports shooter. He competed in the mixed trap event at the 1980 Summer Olympics.

References

External links
 

1957 births
Living people
Czech male sport shooters
Olympic shooters of Czechoslovakia
Shooters at the 1980 Summer Olympics
People from Mělník
Sportspeople from the Central Bohemian Region